The Nickelodeon Germany Kids' Choice Awards, also known as the Nick Verleihung was an annual awards show that aired on Nickelodeon (Germany). Its first edition was held in 1996, the final edition on 17 October 2008. As in the original version, winners receive a hollow orange blimp figurine, a logo outline for much of the network's 1984-2009 era, which also functions as a kaleidoscope. Since 2010 the original version is shown with a category for Germany, Austria and Switzerland.

2007

Favourite Actor/Actress 

Laudators were Mandy and Bahar from Monrose.

 Jimi Blue Ochsenknecht
 Susan Sideropoulos
 Alexandra Neldel
 Devon Werkheiser
 Jamie Lynn Spears (Winner)

Favourite Singer 

Laudator was Josh Peck.

 LaFee (Winner)
 Christina Stürmer
 Mark Medlock
 Nevio Passaro
 Sarah Connor
 Miley Cyrus
 Taio Cruz

Favourite TV Show 

Laudators were Timo and Franky from Panik (Nevada Tan).

 SpongeBob SquarePants
 Gute Zeiten, schlechte Zeiten
 Ned's Declassified School Survival Guide (Winner)
 Schloss Einstein
 Kim Possible

The prize was accepted by Devon Werkheiser.

Favourite Movie 

Laudator was Gülcan Kamps.

 Pirates of the Caribbean: At World's End
 Shrek the Third
 Harry Potter and the Order of the Phoenix
  (Winner)
 Surf's Up

The prize was accepted by Anne Mühlmeier, Jimi Blue Ochsenknecht and Wilson Gonzalez Ochsenknecht.

Favourite Music Group 
Laudator was Nena.

 Tokio Hotel
 US5 (Winners)
 Monrose
 Nevada Tan
 Killerpilze

US5 accepted the prize incomplete, because Michael Johnson left the band shortly before the show.

Favourite Athlete 
 Lukas Podolski (Winner)
 Michael Ballack
 Birgit Prinz
 Marcel Reif
 Dirk Nowitzki

Hidden Talent 
This prize was chosen by the children on the show. The winner was traditionally slimed. Laudator was Susan Sideropoulos.

 Felix von Jascheroff – Become red
 Liza Li – Squint while viewing the Iris "tremble"
 Bürger Lars Dietrich – Eyebrow wave
 Nela Panghy-Lee – Wiggle her nostrils 
 Elton (Winner) – Imitation of Stefan Raab during aerobatics

2008

Favourite Music Group 
 US5 (Winners)
 Revolverheld
 Monrose
 Tokio Hotel
 Culcha Candela

Favourite Singer 
 LaFee
 Thomas Godoj (Winner)
 Sarah Connor
 Jimi Blue Ochsenknecht
 Stefanie Heinzmann

Favourite Movie 
Laudator was Miranda Cosgrove.

 Kung Fu Panda
 
 Horton hears a Who!
 Freche Mädchen (Winner)
 Asterix at the Olympic Games

Favourite Athlete 
 Michael Ballack
 Dirk Nowitzki
 Magdalena Neuner
 Fabian Hambüchen
 Bastian Schweinsteiger (Winner)

Favourite TV Show  
Laudators were Lexington Bridge.

 Avatar: The Last Airbender
 Hannah Montana
 Pokémon
 Gute Zeiten, schlechte Zeiten
 iCarly (Winner)

The prize was accepted by Miranda Cosgrove.

Favourite Actor/Actress 
 Jimi Blue Ochsenknecht (Winner)
 Miranda Cosgrove
 Michael "Bully" Herbig
 Josephine Schmidt
 Drake Bell

Nickelodeon Kids' Choice Awards